USA Volleyball (USAV) is a non-profit organization which is recognized as the national governing body of volleyball in the United States by the Fédération Internationale de Volleyball (FIVB) and the United States Olympic Committee (USOC). It is headquartered in Colorado Springs, Colorado, and was founded by the YMCA of the USA. The organization is responsible for selecting and supporting US national teams that compete in FIVB-sanctioned international volleyball and beach volleyball competitions such as the Olympic Summer Games. USA Volleyball is also charged with fostering the development of the sport of volleyball within the United States through involvement with its forty Regional Volleyball Associations (RVAs).

USA Volleyball was previously known as United States Volleyball Association (USVBA).

Publications
Volleyball USA is the official magazine of USA Volleyball. Published four times a year, the magazine provides information regarding the national teams, youth programs, beach volleyball, and regional activities.

The USA Volleyball Domestic Competition Regulations (DCR), formerly published annually, is now published on a two-year cycle as of the 2009 season. The DCR is based on FIVB rules for both indoor and beach volleyball, while incorporating modifications for domestic play in the United States. Other sections of the DCR include refereeing techniques, scorekeeping instructions, and tournament guidelines.

Olympic results

FIVB World Championship results

USA Volleyball regions
There are forty regions of organized competition for adults and juniors in the United States. These regions are grouped into four zones and eight sections. Each region has its own bylaws but are required to follow the national standards and practices.

Central Zone
Central East Section
Badger Region (BG) – Wisconsin
Great Lakes Region (GL) – Most of Illinois
Gateway Region (GW) – Southern Illinois and eastern Missouri
Lakeshore Region (LK) – Michigan except the Upper Peninsula
North Country Region (NO) – Minnesota, North Dakota, South Dakota, and the Upper Peninsula of Michigan
Hoosier Region (HO) – Indiana
Pioneer Region (PR) – Kentucky
Central West Section
Great Plains Region (GP) – Nebraska
Heart of America Region (HA) – Kansas, Western Missouri
Iowa Region (IA) – Iowa
Rocky Mountain Region (RM) – Colorado and Wyoming
Pacific Zone
Pacific Zone North
Alaska Region (AK) – Alaska
Columbia Empire Region (CE) – Representing Oregon and a small southern part of Washington
Evergreen Region (EV) – Eastern Washington, northern Idaho and Montana
Puget Sound Region (PS) – Western Washington
Pacific Zone South
Aloha Region (AH) – Hawaii
Intermountain Region (IM) – Utah and Southern Idaho
Moku O Keawe Region (MK) – Hawaii
Northern California Region (NC) – Northern California and Nevada, except Las Vegas
Atlantic Zone
North Atlantic Section
Chesapeake Region (CH) – Most of Maryland, Delaware, Washington D.C. and Northern Virginia
GEVA (Garden Empire Volleyball Association) – New Jersey, New York City, Long Island, Westchester & Rockland Counties, and a small portion of western Connecticut
Excelsior (XL) – Northeast New York State
Keystone Region (KE) – Pennsylvania except the westernmost portion
New England Region (NE) – Maine, Vermont, New Hampshire, Massachusetts, Most of Connecticut, and Rhode Island
Ohio Valley Region (OV)- Ohio and the western bordering counties of Pennsylvania and West Virginia
Western Empire Region (WE) –  Western New York State
South Atlantic Section
Carolina Region (CR) – North Carolina
Florida Region (FL) – Most of Florida (Excluding the panhandle)
Old Dominion Region (OD) – Virginia except northern (near D.C.)
Palmetto Region (PM) – South Carolina
Southern Region (SO) – Georgia, Alabama and most of Tennessee
Border Zone
Border East Section
Bayou Region (BY) – Southern Louisiana
Delta Region (DE) – Arkansas, Northern Louisiana, Mississippi, and western Tennessee
Gulf Coast Region (GC) – Southern Alabama, Southern Mississippi, and the Florida panhandle
Lone Star Region (LS) – Southern Texas
North Texas Region (NT) – Northern Texas
Oklahoma Region (OK) – Oklahoma
Border West Section
Arizona Region (AZ) – Arizona
Southern California Region (SC) – Southern California, and Las Vegas
Sun Country Region (SU) – West Texas and New Mexico

See also
 United States men's national volleyball team
 United States women's national volleyball team
 United States national beach volleyball team

References

External links
 
 United States Volleyball Association Collection – Ball State University Archives and Special Collections Research Center

National members of the North, Central America and Caribbean Volleyball Confederation
Volleyball
Volleyball in the United States
Non-profit organizations based in Colorado